Stari Grad ("Old Town") may refer to:

Bosnia and Herzegovina
 Stari Grad, Sarajevo, a municipality in Sarajevo

Croatia
 Stari Grad, Croatia, a town on the island of Hvar

Montenegro
 Stara Varoš, Podgorica, former neighborhood in Podgorica

North Macedonia
 Stari Grad, Čaška, a village in municipality of Čaška

Serbia
 Stari Grad, Belgrade, a municipality in Belgrade
 Stari Grad, Novi Sad, a neighborhood in Novi Sad
 Stari Grad, Užice, the remains of a fort in Užice
 Stari Grad, Kragujevac, former city municipality of Kragujevac

Slovenia
 Ortnek Castle, in the municipality of Ribnica
 Stari Grad, Makole

See also
 Starigrad (disambiguation)
 Novi Grad (disambiguation)
 Gornji Grad (disambiguation)
 Donji Grad (disambiguation)
 Grad (toponymy)
 Staro Selo (disambiguation)